Esquemas (Spanish for "Schemes") is the second Spanish-language studio album by American singer Becky G. It was released on May 13, 2022 through Kemosabe Records, RCA Records and Sony Music Latin.

Esquemas debuted at number 92 on the US Billboard 200, including number 5 on the Top Latin Albums and number 1 on the Latin Pop Albums chart with 11,000 album equivalent units.

Background
Gomez first announced the album through Instagram by unveiling the album's cover art and title just hours after the album’s fourth single "No Mienten" was released. 

Gomez started sharing snippets of songs after the album was announced including the songs "Tajín" with Puerto Rican rapper Guaynaa, "Kill Bill" and the album's fifth single "Bailé Con Mi Ex".
 
The song titles for the album's tracklist were unveiled on May 5, 2022 and the official tracklist was unveiled on May 9, 2022. It revealed that the album has new collaborations with Guaynaa and Elena Rose, and the previously released collaborations with El Alfa, Natti Natasha and Karol G.

Singles
On April 20, 2021, Gomez and Natti Natasha released their second collaboration and third song together "Ram Pam Pam" as a single for both of their second studio albums.
 
On June 4, 2021, Gomez collaborated with El Alfa on the song "Fulanito", released as the second single from the album. A dance for the song became viral on the app TikTok.
 
On February 10, 2022, Gomez collaborated with Karol G on the song "Mamiii", released as the third single from the album. The song became both their highest charting song on the Billboard Hot 100.
 
"No Mienten" was released on April 20, 2022, as the album's fourth single.
 
"Bailé Con Mi Ex" was released on May 10, 2022 as the album's fifth single.

Critical reception

Year-end lists

Accolades

Track listing

Charts

Weekly charts

Year-end charts

Certifications

Release history

References

 

2022 albums
Becky G albums
Spanish-language albums
Sony Music Latin albums
Kemosabe Records albums
RCA Records albums